Pel–Ebstein fever is a rarely seen condition noted in patients with Hodgkin's lymphoma in which the patient experiences fevers which cyclically increase then decrease over an average period of one or two weeks. A cyclic fever may also be associated with other conditions, but it is not called "Pel–Ebstein fever" unless the fever is associated with Hodgkin's.

Signs and symptoms

Causes
The cause is currently unknown although speculation centers on host immune response – particularly the cyclical release of cytokines, lymph node necrosis, and damaged stromal cells.

Diagnosis
Cyclical fevers normally require periodic temperature monitoring to detect, though it is possible one could sense subjective changes in body temperature as well.  To count as Pel-Ebstein fever diagnostic workup for Hodgkin's lymphoma would be required as well if that diagnosis was not already made.

Treatment
Treatment with non-steroidal anti-inflammatory agents or treatment of the underlying Hodgkin's (usually with chemotherapy) will help the symptoms.

Eponym
The condition is named after Wilhelm Ebstein and P. K. Pel who both published papers in 1887 noting the phenomenon. Both doctors published in the same journal, though Pel published first by several months. A long-term dispute persisted between Pel and Ebstein on the etiology of the condition.

Controversy
Researchers have speculated whether this condition truly exists, since some authorities anecdotally estimate only a 5–10% occurrence rate. In his Lettsomian Lecture Making Sense, delivered to the Medical Society of London in 1959, Richard Asher refers to Pel–Ebstein fever as an example of a condition that exists only because it has a name.  "Every student and every doctor knows that cases of Hodgkin's disease may show a fever that is high for one week and low for the next week and so on. Does this phenomenon really exist at all?..."

References

External links 

Fever
Hematologic malignant neoplasms